Eriophorum callitrix, commonly known as Arctic cotton, Arctic cottongrass, suputi, or pualunnguat in Inuktitut, is a perennial Arctic plant in the sedge family, Cyperaceae. It is one of the most widespread flowering plants in the northern hemisphere and tundra regions. Upon every stem grows a single round, white and wooly fruit. The seeds are covered in this cottony mass and usually disperse when the wind carries them away. Eriophorum callitrix has narrow, grass-like leaves. Its habitats include tundra and calcareous bogs.

This plant is food for migrating snow geese, caribou and their calves. The Inuit used the seed heads as wicks in seal oil lamps. Clumps were placed into babies' pants and then thrown away when soiled.

References

External links

Polarhusky.com

callitrix
Plants described in 1831